"I Need You" is a song by Depeche Mode vocalist Dave Gahan from his debut studio album, Paper Monsters (2003). It was released on 18 August 2003 as the album's second single, reaching number 27 in the UK Singles Chart. The single was completely remixed by Alan Moulder for single release, with new vocals and a new musical structure, being quicker and cleaner than the album version.

Track listings
UK CD single (CDMUTE301)
"I Need You" (radio mix) – 3:40
"Closer" – 4:05
"Breathe" – 4:50

UK limited-edition CD single (LCDMUTE301)
"I Need You" (Ladytron detoxxMixx) – 4:00
"I Need You" (Gabriel & Dresden Unplugged mix) – 9:39
"I Need You" (Jay's Summerdub) – 6:17

UK DVD single (DVDMUTE301)
"Black and Blue Again" (acoustic) (video) – 5:00
"I Need You" (Ladytron detoxxMixx – instrumental) – 3:59
"Dirty Sticky Floors" (Lexicon Avenue Dirty Sticky dub) – 8:31

UK 12-inch single (12MUTE301) – released 1 September 2003
A. "I Need You" (Gabriel & Dresden Unplugged mix) – 10:15
AA. "I Need You" (Gabriel & Dresden Plugged dub) – 10:16

UK limited-edition 12-inch single (L12MUTE301) – released 1 September 2003
A. "I Need You" (Jay's Summerdub) – 6:16
AA1. "I Need You" (Ladytron detoxxMixx) – 3:59
AA2. "I Need You" (Ladytron detoxxMixx – instrumental) – 3:59

US CD single (42643-2)
"I Need You" (radio mix) – 3:33
"Closer" – 4:08
"Breathe" – 4:56
"I Need You" (Ladytron detoxxMixx) – 4:01
"I Need You" (Jay's Summerdub) – 6:25
"I Need You" (Gabriel & Dresden Unplugged mix) – 10:13

US 12-inch single (0-42643)
A. "I Need You" (Gabriel & Dresden Unplugged mix) – 10:13
B1. "I Need You" (Ladytron detoxxMixx) – 4:01
B2. "I Need You" (Jay's Summerdub) – 6:25
C. "I Need You" (Gabriel & Dresden Plugged dub) – 10:13
D1. "Dirty Sticky Floors" (Lexicon Avenue Dirty Sticky dub) – 8:39
D2. "I Need You" (Ladytron detoxxMixx instrumental) – 3:59

Credits and personnel
Design – Four5One*Creative* 
Engineer [Mix] – Jack Clark 
Engineer [Recording] – Jonathan Adler 
Mixed By – Ken Thomas 
Photography By, Artwork [Dave Gahan Logo] – Anton Corbijn 
Programmed By – Jon Collyer 
Programmed By [Additional] – Knox Chandler 
Written-By – Dave Gahan, Knox Chandler

Charts

Release history

References

External links
 Single information from the official Dave Gahan website
 AllMusic review

2003 singles
2003 songs
Dave Gahan songs
Mute Records singles
Songs written by Dave Gahan
Songs written by Knox Chandler